Xhevdet Picari was an Albanian military figure from Gjirokastër. He was a commander during the Vlora War.

References

Albanian military personnel
People from Gjirokastër